Maregiglio is an Italian shipping company which operates in routes from Porto Santo Stefano to Isola del Giglio and Giannutri, in Tuscany. It was founded in 1969 by Giuseppe Rum to establish a transport service to and from the island of Giglio.

Fleet

The fleet of the past 
 Giuseppe Rum (2005–2012) hired to Toremar
 Oceania (1998–2004)
 Giglio Espresso II (1988–2000)
 Giglio Espresso (1971–1988) 
 Freccia del Giglio (hydrofoil) (1975–1987)
 Gabbiano II 
 Gabbiano
 Azimut (Fast boat)
 Domizia (Fast boat)
 Vieste II (Fast boat)

Routes 
Porto Santo Stefano↔Isola del Giglio
Porto Santo Stefano↔Isola di Giannutri

Events 

On the night of 13 January 2012 several ships of Maregiglio have occurred among first aid in the evacuation of the Costa Concordia wrecked at Isola del Giglio for the transport of passengers shipwrecked with the mainland.

See also 
Monte Argentario
Tuscan Archipelago
Costa Concordia disaster

References

External links
 Official website

Shipping companies of Italy
Ferry companies of Italy
Transport in Tuscany